A miners' court was a type of quasi-judicial court common in the American Old West that summoned a subset of the miners in a district when a dispute arose.

Background
It was made to retain order and decide punishments within mining communities. A presiding officer or judge was elected and a jury was selected. Other systems that were used included alcaldes and arbitration. In the event a decision was disputed, a mass meeting of the mining camp could be called to allow a dissatisfied party to plead his case and possibly get the decision reversed.

Further reading
Boggs, Johnny D. Great Murder Trials of the Old West. Piano: Republic of Texas Press, 2003. 
Burns, John F., and Richard J. Orsi. Taming the Elephant: Politics, Government, and Law in Pioneer California. Berkeley: U of California, 2003.

References

External links
An American Experiment in Anarcho-Capitalism: The Not So Wild, Wild West

Quasi-judicial bodies
American frontier
History of mining in the United States
Courts by type